Loren Duane Cunningham (born June 30, 1935) is founder of the international Christian missionary movement Youth with a Mission (YWAM) and the University of the Nations. Cunningham founded YWAM in Lausanne, Switzerland in 1960 with his wife, Darlene Cunningham, at the age of 24. They reside in Kona, Hawaii and are members of the YWAM Global Leadership Team.



Early life

Loren Cunningham was born on June 30, 1935, in the oil boom town of Taft, California.

Ministry

Youth with a Mission

While traveling in the Bahamas in 1956 as part of a gospel quartet, Cunningham claims to have experienced a vision. In this vision, he described waves on the shorelines of the continents on a world map, eventually growing bigger and bigger, covering the landmass. He records that the waves in this vision changed to young people covering the continents, talking to people about their faith. This vision would inspire the beginning of Youth with a Mission four years later as a movement providing missionary opportunities for Christian youth after high school, regardless of their denomination.

He and his wife continue to have influence on the leadership of YWAM International, holding the title of Founders of the Mission. They are members of the YWAM Global Leadership Team and advisers to the Team 3 leadership of YWAM International.

University of Nations

In 1978, Cunnigham co-founded the University of the Nations in Kailua-Kona, Hawaii with Howard Malmstadt.

Bibliography

 (first published under the title Winning God's Way)

See also
 David Loren Cunningham – Loren and Darlene's son
 Seven Mountain Mandate

References

External links

 University of the Nations International homepage
 Recordings of Loren teaching can be downloaded from the YWAM Podcast site at http://ywampodcast.org

1935 births
Living people
American evangelicals
Christians from California
People from Maricopa, California
University High School (Los Angeles) alumni